The Cisalpine Celtic languages of northern Italy include the Lepontic language and the Cisalpine Gaulish language.

Transalpine Celtic refers to Celtic languages on the other side of the Alps (from Rome) such as Transalpine Gaulish.

See also
 Lepontic language
 Gaulish language
 Ligurian (ancient language)
 Continental Celtic languages

References

Continental Celtic languages
Languages of ancient Italy
Extinct Celtic languages